Facivermis (meaning "torch worm" ) is a genus of sessile lobopodian from the Lower Cambrian Maotianshan shales of China

Anatomy
Facivermis was a worm-like creature up to 90 mm long. Its body was divided into three sections. The anterior section had five equally sized pairs of appendages with two setal rows along the margins. The middle section was elongate and five times longer than the anterior or posterior. The posterior section was pear-shaped and had three rows of hooks surrounding the anus.

Classification

Facivermis was considered by its describers to be a polychaete worm. An affinity to the unusual crustacean lineage Pentastomida has also been proposed, but is seen as unlikely. Since its discovery, however, most evidence has supported its being a lobopodian. Liu et al. draw a comparison to the known lobopodian Miraluolishania. Liu et al. also note that the pear-shaped end bears a close resemblance to the proboscis of priapulid worms if it is interpreted as being the anterior end. The possible priapulid "Xishania" longiusula'''s fragmentary remains closely resembles the pear-shaped end of Facivermis, so Huang et al. assigned "X". longiusula to Facivermis as a second species. In 2020, new specimens of the organism were found with a preserved tube, showing that it was a sessile tube worm-like lobopodian belonging to Luolishaniidae, with a bulbous posterior.

EcologyFacivermis'' was previously interpreted as a predator that anchored itself into sediment with its hooked posterior end and used its anterior appendages to catch prey. One fossil has a possible bradoriid preserved in its gut. The new specimens suggest a lifestyle similar to feather duster worms, with the anterior hooks used to anchor itself into sediment.

References

Cambrian animals
Lobopodia
Cambrian genus extinctions